John Wilson,  (February 5, 1807 – June 3, 1869) was an Ontario lawyer, judge and political figure. He shot and killed Robert Lyon in what is believed to have been the last duel fought in Ontario and the last fatal duel in Canada.

He was born in Paisley, Renfrewshire, Scotland in 1807 and settled in Perth, Upper Canada with his family around 1823. He studied law in Perth with James Boulton. The duel was fought on June 13, 1833 over comments that Lyon, another law student, had made against the character of a Miss Elizabeth Hughes (who Wilson later married). Wilson and his second were charged with murder but acquitted. He was called to the Upper Canada bar in 1835, joined Boulton's practice at Niagara and later set up his own practice at London. He helped organize local resistance against the Upper Canada Rebellion and was named a captain in the militia in 1838. Wilson served as warden for the London District from 1842 to 1844 and also served as solicitor for the city of London. He was elected to the Legislative Assembly of the Province of Canada in an 1847 by-election as a Conservative and then was reelected in 1848 and 1854. In 1856, Wilson was named Queen's Counsel. He was elected to the Legislative Council for St. Clair division in 1863 but was named judge in the Court of Common Pleas a few months later. He sentenced seven Fenians captured during the Fenian raids to death, but these sentences were commuted.

Wilson died in Westminster Township in 1869.

Other sources, however, agree that it was the last duel in Ontario which was then known as Upper Canada, but not the last fatal duel in what is now the country of Canada. For example, Radio Canada International and the Montreal Gazette refer to documents that state that the last fatal duel occurred  on 22 May 1838, in Quebec, then known as Lower Canada, between British officer Major Henry Warde and lawyer Robert Sweeney; Warde was wounded and subsequently died.

References

External links
Biography at the Dictionary of Canadian Biography Online
The lives of the judges of Upper Canada and Ontario : from 1791 to the present time, D.B. Read (1888)
The Duel of 1833 - Lanark County Genealogical Society

1807 births
1869 deaths
Members of the Legislative Assembly of the Province of Canada from Canada West
Canadian judges
People from Perth, Ontario
Scottish emigrants to pre-Confederation Ontario
Canadian duellists
People of the Fenian raids
Speakers of the Legislative Assembly of Upper Canada
Canadian King's Counsel
Immigrants to Upper Canada
19th-century Canadian judges